Axomadol (INN, USAN) (code name EN3324) is a synthetic, centrally-acting opioid analgesic of the benzenoid class which was under investigation by Endo Pharmaceuticals in collaboration with Grünenthal for the treatment of chronic, moderate to severe lower back pain and arthrosis. Development was halted after phase II clinical trials as it did not meet the pre-determined clinical endpoints.

See also
 Tramadol

References

Dimethylamino compounds
Analgesics
Diols
Opioids
Abandoned drugs